Russell Johnson (February 21, 1920 – September 14, 1991) was a sports shooter who represents the United States Virgin Islands. He competed in the mixed skeet event at the 1976 Summer Olympics.

References

External links
 

1920 births
1991 deaths
United States Virgin Islands male sport shooters
Olympic shooters of the United States Virgin Islands
Shooters at the 1976 Summer Olympics
Place of birth missing